Thiovulum majus is a species of bacteria and a member of the phylum Campylobacterota. This sulfide-oxidizing species has been observed to swim at speeds as high as 615 micrometers per second, faster than those recorded for any other bacterial species.

References

Campylobacterota